Bustenskjold is a 1958 Norwegian comedy film directed by Helge Lunde, starring Leif Juster. It is based on the cartoon Jens von Bustenskjold by Anders Bjørgaard and Sigurd Lybeck.

Sources

External links
 
 

Norwegian comedy films
1958 films
1958 comedy films
Films based on Norwegian comics
Live-action films based on comics
Films set in Norway
Films shot in Norway
1950s Norwegian-language films